Giovanni Lo Porto (23 June 1977 – 15 January 2015)  was an Italian aid worker. In January 2012, he was abducted by militants while working in the Pakistani city of Multan, along with a German colleague, Bernd Muehlenbeck. Muehlenbeck was later freed inside Afghanistan. Lo Porto was accidentally killed by a US drone strike on the Afghanistan-Pakistan border while being kept hostage, along with American contractor Warren Weinstein and American al Qaeda commanders Adam Yahiye Gadahn and Ahmed Farouq.

See also
 Foreign hostages in Pakistan

References

2015 deaths
Foreign hostages in Pakistan
Italian expatriates in Pakistan
Terrorism deaths in Pakistan
Italian people taken hostage
Deaths by United States drone strikes in Pakistan
Accidental deaths in Pakistan
1977 births